is a Japanese footballer. He played professionally for JPV Marikina during the 2018 Philippines Football League season. Previously he played as a striker for Edgeworth FC in the National Premier Leagues Northern NSW.

Personal life
Moriyasu's father, Hajime Moriyasu, is a former international football player and the current manager of the Japan national football team.

Career statistics

Club
.

Notes

References

1993 births
Living people
Ryutsu Keizai University alumni
Japanese expatriate footballers
Japanese footballers
Association football midfielders
Philippines Football League players
Sanfrecce Hiroshima players
JPV Marikina F.C. players
FC Rot-Weiß Koblenz players
Japanese expatriate sportspeople in Australia
Expatriate soccer players in Australia
Japanese expatriate sportspeople in the Philippines
Expatriate footballers in the Philippines
Japanese expatriate sportspeople in Germany
Expatriate footballers in Germany